The West Broad Street Commercial Historic District is a national historic district located at Richmond, Virginia.  The district encompasses 20 contributing buildings built between about 1900 and the late 1930s. Located in the district is the Forbes Motor Car Company (1919), Harper-Overland Company building (1921), Firestone Building (1929), Engine Company No. 10 Firehouse (c. 1900), and the Saunders Station Post Office (1937). The majority of the buildings are two-to-four stories in height and are composed of brick with stucco, stone and metal detailing. Located in the district is the separately listed The Coliseum-Duplex Envelope Company Building.

It was added to the National Register of Historic Places in 2001.

References

External links
1322-1324 West Broad Street (Commercial Building), Richmond, Independent City, VA: 1 photo and 1 photo caption page at Historic American Buildings Survey

Historic American Buildings Survey in Virginia
Historic districts on the National Register of Historic Places in Virginia
Commercial buildings on the National Register of Historic Places in Virginia
Buildings and structures in Richmond, Virginia
National Register of Historic Places in Richmond, Virginia